Galatasaray SK. women's 2011–2012 season is the 2011–2012 basketball season for Turkish professional basketball club Galatasaray Medical Park.

The club competes in EuroLeague Women, Turkish Women's Basketball League, and the Turkish Cup Basketball.

Depth chart

Squad changes for the 2011–2012 season

In:

Out:

Results, schedules and standings

Preseason games

Kartal Magic Cup 2011

International Galatasaray Store Cup
Galatasaray MP won the cup.

Results

Euroleague Women 2011–12
 Galatasaray MP were already qualified for the Final 8.

Group A

Regular season

Turkish Basketball League 2011–12

Regular season

Turkish Cup 2011–12

President Cup 2011–12

References

2012
Galatasaray Sports Club 2011–12 season